The Law & Harry McGraw is an American mystery crime drama television series created by Peter S. Fischer and a spin-off of Murder, She Wrote that aired on CBS from September 27, 1987, to February 10, 1988.

Plot
The series stars Jerry Orbach as a loudmouthed, uncouth, old school private detective who continually finds himself solving mysteries on behalf of the prim and proper attorney (played by Barbara Babcock), who has an office across the hall. The attorney, Ellie Maginnis, finds McGraw's methods somewhat hard to digest, albeit effective, and a romantic attraction between the two is suggested although the series didn't last long enough for such a subplot to fully develop.

Cast
Jerry Orbach as Harry McGraw
Barbara Babcock as Ellie Maginnis
Earl Boen as Howard
Juliana Donald as  E.J. Brunson 
Shea Farrell as Steve Lacey
Marty Davis as Cookie
Peter Haskell as Tyler Chase

Episodes

Cancellation
After the show's fast cancellation (it lasted a little more than a half-season), Orbach reprised the role of Harry McGraw in a few episodes of Murder, She Wrote before a few years later moving on to play NYPD Senior detective Lennie Briscoe on fellow Universal Television series Law & Order.

Home media
The complete series was released in Australia by Madman Entertainment in 2012 as a 5-Disc (PAL Format) box set for region 4.

References

External links
The Law & Harry McGraw at the Internet Movie Database

1987 American television series debuts
1988 American television series endings
1980s American crime drama television series
1980s American mystery television series
American detective television series
CBS original programming
American television spin-offs
Murder, She Wrote
Television series by Universal Television
English-language television shows
Television shows set in Boston
Television series created by Peter S. Fischer